NHL 2K was a series of hockey games developed by Visual Concepts. It was published by Sega Sports from 2000 to 2004, and 2K Sports from 2005 to 2014. The games are officially licensed from the National Hockey League and NHL Players Association. 

The series was initially developed for consoles, with its main competitor being EA Sports' NHL series. Beginning with the release of NHL 2K11 in 2010, the series would eventually become exclusive to mobile devices.

Installments

History

Sega Sports
The series launched on the Dreamcast on February 7, 2000 as part of the Sega Sports line-up of sports titles. Its success led to it becoming one of the few Sega All Stars titles. The follow-up, NHL 2K2, was released on February 14, 2002, and was the last game released for the Dreamcast before the system was discontinued.

NHL 2K3 was released on November 19, 2002. It was the first in the series to feature a franchise mode, while the Xbox version became the first online console hockey game.  Sega had signed a deal with Take-Two Interactive in which Global Star Software distributed and co-published Sega's ESPN sports games. ESPN NHL 2K5 was released on August 30, 2004, and was the last game in the series to  be published by Sega, and the last to be released under the ESPN branding.

2K Sports

NHL 2K6 and 2K7
NHL 2K6 was soon released on September 7, 2005 as a launch title for the Xbox 360. It was the first game to be published under Take-Two's 2K company, after the acquisition of developer Visual Concepts. New features included a franchise mode, and a new 'goalie control' feature. 

NHL 2K7, released on September 12, 2006, featured new animations, mainly geared towards skating, and 'Cinemotion' which is designed to capture the intensity of hockey through close up angles and orchestral music.

NHL 2K8
NHL 2K8 was released in September 2007. The game features an all new face-off system which includes tie-ups, warnings, jostling, and penalties. The game also includes a new goaltending engine with improved goalies that react according to the situation. Goalies will challenge the puck carrier when appropriate, perform spectacular butterfly saves, and guard the post. Other features include variable attendance, a new skating engine, and authentic player equipment. Jason Spezza from the Ottawa Senators was on the cover.

NHL 2K9
NHL 2K9 was released in September 2008, with Columbus Blue Jackets' captain Rick Nash as the cover athlete. NHL 2K9 was released on the Wii console, the first NHL licensed game to be released on the platform, in addition to the PlayStation 2, Xbox 360 and PlayStation 3.

NHL 2K10
NHL 2K10 was released on September 15, 2009, with Washington Capitals left-winger Alexander Ovechkin on a special 10th Anniversary cover. The Wii version now sported online play, Mii Integration, and Wii MotionPlus. This is also the last game in the series to be released on the PlayStation 3, PlayStation 2 and Xbox 360. It was the last game in the series to be released on Microsoft and Sony consoles.

NHL 2K11
NHL 2K11 was released on September 7, 2010 for iPhones and the Wii. On March 3, 2010 CEO Ben Feder explained that "We have decided to reevaluate our NHL strategy and will only be releasing NHL 2K11 for the Wii in fiscal year 2010. We want to become a stronger competitor in this category and taking a year off on PS3 and Xbox 360, while focusing on making the best possible game for Wii, should allow us to accomplish that goal." Vancouver Canucks forward Ryan Kesler was the cover athlete for the game.

Discontinuation 
On May 25, 2011, 2K Sports confirmed the NHL 2K series would go on hiatus.

In September 2014, 2K Sports announced that the series would return exclusively on the iOS and Android platforms with NHL 2K. It would be the last game in the series.

NHL SuperCard series

NHL SuperCard, a spin-off of the NHL 2K series, features gameplay that closely resembles Cat Daddy Games' WWE SuperCard and Take-Two Interactive's other mobile games. The first game was co-developed by Wahoo Studios, while Koolhaus Games developed the latter two instalments. All three games were released on iOS and Android platforms.

Games
NHL SuperCard, released on October 8, 2015 and featured Zach Parise on the cover.
 NHL SuperCard 2K17, released on October 13, 2016 and featured Logan Couture on the cover.
NHL SuperCard 2K18, released on October 10, 2017 and featured Kyle Turris on the cover.

References

External links
NHL 2K official Facebook page

2K Games franchises
Take-Two Interactive franchises
 
ESPN National Hockey League video games
Video game franchises
Video games developed in the United States
Video game franchises introduced in 2000